Erick All (born September 13, 2000) is an American football tight end for the Iowa Hawkeyes. He formerly played for the Michigan Wolverines.

Early years
All was born in 2000 in Indiana. At age five months, he was trapped in his playpen on the second floor of a house fire at the family home in Richmond, Indiana. Firefighter Tom Broyles climbed a ladder and entered the smoke-filled bedroom and rescued All. All was not breathing at the time, but firefighters administered CPR, and All regained consciousness. During the 2021 season, All's family invited All's rescuer to meet All at a Michigan football game, and the two embraced.

All attended Fairfield High School in Fairfield, Ohio. As a senior, he caught 30 passes for 465 yards and four touchdowns. ESPN rated him as a three-star prospect and the No. 10 tight end in the Class of 2019, and the No. 18 prospect in Ohio.

College career

Michigan 
All verballly committed to play for the University of Michigan in the summer of 2018, then signed his letter of intent in December 2018. He enrolled early and impressed with his performance during spring practice.

As a freshman in 2019, All appeared in 11 games at tight end and on special teams. As a sophomore in 2020, he appeared in all six games and caught 12 passes for 82 yards. He received criticism after dropping several passes during the 2020 season.

As a junior in 2021, All caught 34 passes for 374 yards and two touchdowns. Against Michigan State, he caught 10 passes for 98 yards. Against Penn State, he fought through a high ankle sprain and caught the game-winning touchdown pass, a 47-yard strike with 3:29 remaining in the game.

In 2022, All appeared in only three games (three receptions for 36 yards) before sustaining a back injury that required surgery. On December 5, 2022, All announced he was entering the NCAA transfer portal.

Iowa 
On December 14, 2022, All transferred to Iowa.

References

The Richmond, Indiana newspaper is the Palladium-Item, not the name given here.

External links

 Michigan Wolverines bio

2000 births
Living people
American football tight ends
Michigan Wolverines football players
People from Fairfield, Ohio
Players of American football from Ohio
Iowa Hawkeyes football players